Tkachyov is a rural locality (a khutor) in Krasnoulskoye Rural Settlement of Maykopsky District, Russia. The population was 207 as of 2018. There is 1 street.

Geography 
Tkachyov is located 31 km north of Tulsky (the district's administrative centre) by road. Komintern is the nearest rural locality.

References 

Rural localities in Maykopsky District